Coptotriche crataegifoliae is a moth of the family Tischeriidae. It was described by Annette Frances Braun in 1972. It is found in North America in Ontario, Quebec, Ohio and Pennsylvania.

The larvae feed on Crataegus mollis. They mine the leaves of their host plant.

References

Moths described in 1972
Tischeriidae